Euriphene ribensis is a butterfly in the family Nymphalidae. It is found in the Democratic Republic of the Congo (Uele, north Kivu, Sankuru and Lualaba), Uganda, western Kenya and north-western Tanzania. The habitat consists of forests.

The larvae feed on Bersama abyssinica.

References

Butterflies described in 1871
Euriphene
Butterflies of Africa
Taxa named by Christopher Ward (entomologist)